Bayankhutag, more commonly known by her Korean royal title as Princess Gyeonghwa (d. 24 July 1344) was a Mongolian imperial family member who became a Korean royal consort as the third wife of King Chungsuk of Goryeo. After his death, she was raped by her stepson, who was then forced to marry her.

Biography

Background
Mysteries surround Bayankhutag's lineage, but since the "Baekan clan" (백안, 伯顔) were nobles at that time, it was believed that she was born into the noble family. Masahiko Morihira has suggested that she was the sister or half-sister of Princess Joguk, King Chungsuk's wife. After her sister's death in 1325, Bayankhutag married her sister's husband, probably between 1330 and 1333 when the King stayed in Yuan dynasty and not long after that they two went back to Goryeo.

Assault
King Chungsuk died in 1339, after which Bayankhutag stayed in Goryeo. The Goryeosa records that, during a meal in her apartments one night, her stepson, Chunghye of Goryeo, got drunk and raped her. The next day, Bayankhutag attempted to flee to the Yuan ambassador for help to leave Goryeo, but Chunghye issued a ban on horses in the city, so she could not leave. He then had her imprisoned in Yeongrak Palace, told the court that she was ill, and posted guards around her apartments. The Yuan emissary eventually visited the palace and insisted that Bayankhutag be released and Chunghye take her as a consort.

As consort, Bayankhutag is recorded to have offered advice in choosing officials in the Yuan Goryeo government. She died in 1344. In 1367, she received her posthumous name from the Yuan dynasty.

Later life and death
King Chunghye died in 1344 while on the road to exile and Bayankhutag then died not long after that. Her funeral was held on 18th days 9th months (Lunar calendar) in the same year and gave her new title as Princess Gyeonghwa (경화공주, 慶華公主). Later, in 1367, the Yuan dynasty bestowed royal title Princess Sukgong Hwiryeong (숙공휘령공주, 肅恭徽寧公主) as her Posthumous name.

In popular culture
Portrayed by Ryu Hyun-kyung in the 2013–2014 MBC TV series Empress Ki.

See also
Goryeo under Mongol rule

References

Notes

Works cited

External links
경화공주 on Encykorea .
경화공주 on Doosan Encyclopedia .

Year of birth unknown
1344 deaths
Mongol consorts of the Goryeo Dynasty
14th-century Mongolian women
Chinese princesses
Rape in Korea
14th-century Korean women